Lipstikka is 2011 Israeli drama film directed by Jonathan Sagall. The film premiered In Competition at the 61st Berlin International Film Festival and was nominated for the Golden Bear.

Cast
 Daniel Caltagirone
 Clara Khoury as Lara
 
 Waleed Akhtar as Raj
 Tali Knight
 John Harley as Radio Presenter (voice)
 David Loughlin as Andy

References

External links
 

2011 films
2011 drama films
Israeli drama films
Films directed by Jonathan Sagall
2010s English-language films